Joaquim Pinheiro (born December 20, 1960) is a retired Portuguese runner.

He competed in the marathon at the 1991 World Championships and the 1992 Summer Olympics, both times without finishing the race.

International competitions

References

External links

The World Cross Country Championships 1973-2005

1960 births
Living people
Portuguese male long-distance runners
Portuguese male marathon runners
Olympic athletes of Portugal
Athletes (track and field) at the 1992 Summer Olympics
World Athletics Championships athletes for Portugal